Jessica Vanessa DeLeon (born April 13, 1992) is an American, internet personality and actress.  DeLeon rose to prominence posting comedic videos to the social media application Vine and when Cosmopolitan Magazine wrote a feature naming her "The Woman Who Makes Six Figures Being A Professional Twerker".

Career 
Vanessa was a teaching assistant in Florida when she began to post videos of her dancing on Vine. Vanessa quickly amassed 1.9 million followers and began to receive payment from advertisers to promote products. Vanessa has stated, "What I make in six seconds would take me four months to make as a teaching assistant". Her brother helped her out by being her camera person. On Instagram, DeLeon began creating viral videos to popular hip-hop songs such as "Coco" by O.T. Genasis and "Don't Sleep" by Dorian.  While most of the responses to her work online has been positive, she shared with Jezebel that she has had two major "breakdowns" over abusive online comments she's received.

In 2016, Vanessa transitioned her internet fame into acting as she landed roles in the Chris Stokes-directed projects Only For One Night and Til Death Do Us Part.

Filmography

Film 
 2017 'Til Death Do Us Part

References 

Dancers from Florida
American Internet celebrities
American actresses
1992 births
Living people
21st-century American women